Vista Group International Limited (Vista Group) provides film industry technology for studios, distributors, exhibitors and moviegoers globally.

Vista Group is made up of eight businesses with more than 630 staff across offices in New Zealand (Auckland HQ), Sydney, Los Angeles, London, Shanghai, Beijing, Mexico City, South Africa, the Netherlands and Romania. Its Vista Cinema software is installed in cinemas in 116 countries. Vista Group is listed on both the New Zealand Stock Exchange (NZX) and Australian Securities Exchange (ASX).

Corporate History 

Vista Entertainment Solutions (Vista Cinema), the original and cornerstone company of Vista Group, was formed in New Zealand in 1996. In 1997, Vista Cinema made its first overseas sales in Argentina and Fiji, at which point its software was adapted to handle multiple languages and accommodate the complex tax laws and film regulations of other countries. This flexibility allowed Vista Cinema to expand rapidly into the diverse cinema markets of Central and North America, Europe, and Asia.

Vista Cinema was initially formed via a joint venture development agreement between Village Force Cinemas Ltd (now Event Cinemas) and Madison Systems Ltd (now Fujitsu Ltd). Madison Systems was part owned and staffed by people who are still staff and now shareholders in Vista Group today. Vista Cinema management took a direct 50% ownership in 2003 and total control of the company in March 2010 - four years prior to the listing of Vista Group in August 2014.

Between 2009 and 2014, Vista acquired total or partial control of a number of companies specializing in technology solutions for the wider film industry. This aligned with the diversification of the company to vertically integrate additional sector requirements such as film distribution management and marketing data analysis.

The 2014 public listing of Vista Group International by the management company that owned Vista Cinema and its acquired companies, saw a listing on the NZX and ASX via an initial public offering of $92.6m, of which $40.0m was new capital. Vista Group (VGL) commenced trading on the NZX Main Board on the 11th of August 2014, with a market capitalization of $191.6m NZD.

Since listing, Vista Group has continued to acquire stakes in a number of technology companies that provide business solutions to the film industry.

In August 2016, Vista Group completed a transaction with movie ticket booking platform Beijing Weiying Technology (WePiao), establishing Vista China (previously a 100%-owned subsidiary of Vista Group), as a joint venture company. This investment from WePiao, and the extended rights from Vista Group to enable the sale of existing software solutions (Vista Cinema, Veezi, Movio, Maccs and Numero), positions Vista China to increase its footprint in the rapidly-expanding China film market.

In August 2017, Vista Group acquired a 60 per cent controlling stake in its long-term Latin American business partner, Senda Dirección Tecnológica, SA de CV, which has been renamed Vista Latin America.

In April 2020, Vista Group partnered with ScreenPlus to launch Screenplus' VOD platform offering available to exhibitors in all major territories, including the US, Canada and UK.

Businesses

Vista Entertainment Solutions (Vista Cinema) 

Vista Cinema designs and develops cinema management software for the Large Circuit Market (cinema exhibitors operating more than 20 screens). Vista Cinema, the company's core product, supports Box Office and Concession sales Point of Sale (POS), and back of house operations. Other Vista Cinema products meet the requirements of wider cinema management including mobile applications, head office administration and analysis and moviegoer services such as online ticketing and loyalty programs. Vista Cinema provides software to over 5500 cinemas in more than 80 countries and their global market share in the large cinema market is calculated at 38%.

 Veezi

Leveraging the IP of Vista Cinema, Veezi launched in March 2012 as a cloud-based cinema management solution for smaller, independent cinemas (cinema exhibitors operating less than 20 screens). Veezi utilizes the Software as a Service (SaaS) model in which users pay a subscription fee to access the product. Used worldwide by a diverse range of small cinema operators, Veezi also supports integration with a number of internet ticket aggregators.

Movio 

Movio, also a SaaS offer, provides marketing data analytics and campaign management software for the film industry. Movio maintains real-time data on the demographic profiles and cinema transactions of identifiable moviegoers. Which is consolidated and processed to design audience segments, create targeted marketing campaigns and measure their effectiveness. Movio holds comprehensive marketing data covering from 39+ million active moviegoers, covering 29% of cinema screens worldwide.

Maccs International 

Maccs International provides software for film distributors and exhibitors. Maccs software facilitates film rights and royalties management, as well as advertisement and distribution via theatrical and non-theatrical sales channels (home entertainment etc.). Maccs software operates in over 45 countries and manages theatrical distribution for over 100 film distributors. The company is the largest provider of this type of software outside of the US. In July 2015, Maccs secured its first customer in the US, Warner Bros. Entertainment Inc.

Numero 

A SaaS solution, Numero provides up to the minute box office reporting software for film studios, independent film distributors and cinemas. Numero is used to extract data from cinema point of sale software, which can then be accessed by distributors for insight into box office revenue and admissions trends.

Cinema Intelligence 

Cinema Intelligence specializes in cloud-based business intelligence and predictive analytics software for cinema exhibitors. Cinema Intelligence solutions use an algorithm to predict attendance and optimize film schedules to maximize admissions. Cinema Scheduler, the company's flagship product, automates the creation of daily film schedules based on the exhibitor's historical box office data.

Powster 

Powster provides film marketing products, music videos, and creative content globally. Their platform is a global solution for movie distributors to direct audiences to purchase tickets at cinemas.  The company creates more than 100 online destinations a month for 70+ movie distributors in more than 40 countries.  The Powster movie platform enables an estimated five million consumers a week to discover cinema show times on official movie websites.

Flicks 

Flicks Limited (Flicks) is a premium online platform used by moviegoers to find movie, cinema and session information. Flicks lists every movie, cinema and session nationwide in its markets, along with reviews, trailers, local release guides, festival profiles and editorial pieces from credited movie-writing talent. A comprehensive cinema registry and booking links is also included in Flicks’ service.

Awards and recognition

 Winner: 'Exporter of the Year to the USA $500,001 - $5m' - AmCham-DHL Express Success & Innovation Awards 2012
 Winner: 'Supreme Award - AmCham-DHL Express Success & Innovation Awards 2012
 Winner: 'International Business Award for companies between $10-$50 million in turnover' - New Zealand Trade and Enterprise Business Awards 2012
 Winner: 'Equity Issue of the Year' - INFINZ Awards 2015
 Winner: 'PWC Hi-Tech Company of the Year' - New Zealand Hi-Tech Awards 2016

Philanthropy 

In February 2015, Vista Group International launched the Vista Foundation, to support the continued success and growth of the New Zealand film industry and increase the accessibility of New Zealand film to wider audiences. Film producer and director Roger Donaldson is the Patron of the Vista Foundation.

The foundation's first initiative was the Vista Film Marketing Programme, launched in partnership with the New Zealand Film Commission (NZFC), which aims to help creative film-makers learn the business side of film marketing.

The first films to benefit from the Vista Film Marketing Programme were the 2016 documentary Chasing Great about the former All Black captain Richie McCaw, and in 2017 Pecking Order, a documentary following members of the Christchurch Poultry Club in the lead up to the National Competition, which was directed by Slavko Martinov and released in April 2017.

The Vista Foundation has also supported, in partnership with the Directors and Editors Guild of New Zealand (DEGNZ), an educative programme Women Filmmakers Incubator designed to accelerate the number of women filmmakers and accelerate their professional development.

References

Software companies of New Zealand
Business software companies
New Zealand brands
Companies listed on the New Zealand Exchange
2014 establishments in New Zealand